William Henry Bates (April 26, 1917 – June 22, 1969) was a member of the United States House of Representatives notable for his staunch support of the United States Navy.

Life and career
He attended local schools and graduated from Worcester Academy in 1936. He received his undergraduate education at Brown University, Providence, R.I., graduating in 1940. Following graduation from Brown, he enlisted in the United States Navy in July 1940 and was commissioned as ensign in the Naval Reserve on January 30, 1941. Bates then received instruction at the Naval Reserve Supply Officer's School at the Naval Medical Center, Washington, DC, before serving successive tours of duty at the Washington Navy Yard and in Constellation (IX-20).

He remained a naval reservist, and by 1949 had become the supply officer for the 4th Naval District.  While Bates was stationed there, his father was killed in a plane crash at the Washington National Airport on November 1, 1949.

Bates resigned his reserve commission — he had attained the rank of lieutenant commander by that time — on February 14, 1950, to fill the seat of his late father in the United States House of Representatives. For nearly two decades, until his death in 1969, Bates staunchly advocated a strong military posture for the United States. On the Joint Congressional Committee on Atomic Energy and the House Armed Services Committee, he vigorously supported the development of nuclear-powered naval vessels. He also vigorously backed incentive pay programs and the establishment of better housing facilities for servicemen. He constantly sought means to enhance the training, caliber, and morale of military personnel. Bates voted in favor of the Civil Rights Acts of 1957, 1960, 1964, and 1968, as well as the 24th Amendment to the U.S. Constitution and the Voting Rights Act of 1965.

Bates died of stomach cancer on June 22, 1969. Immediately upon his death, the U.S. Navy attack submarine , originally planned to be named USS Redfish, was renamed in his honor before her construction began.

The Bates Bridge, which crosses the Merrimack River between Groveland and Haverhill, Massachusetts, is named in his honor.

His great-nephew is comedian John Mulaney, whose maternal grandmother is Bates' sister.

See also
 List of United States Congress members who died in office (1950–99)

References

External links 

1917 births
1969 deaths
Brown University alumni
Harvard Business School alumni
United States Navy personnel of World War II
United States Navy officers
Republican Party members of the United States House of Representatives from Massachusetts
Deaths from cancer in Maryland
Deaths from stomach cancer
20th-century American politicians
United States Navy reservists